Carrier Strike Group One (CSG-1 or CARSTRKGRU 1) is a U.S. Navy carrier strike group.  is the strike group's current flagship, and other units currently assigned are the ship's Carrier Air Wing 2 and embarked Destroyer Squadron 1, deployed with Ticonderoga-class guided-missile cruiser , as well as Arleigh Burke-class guided-missile destroyers  and .

Although the previous Carrier Strike Group One traced its history to Carrier Division 1, formed in 1930, the current Carrier Strike Group One was an entirely new naval formation when it was established in October 2009. During the relocation of its flagship Carl Vinson to its new home base in San Diego, California, it supported Operation Unified Response, providing humanitarian assistance following the 2010 Haiti earthquake.  During its first overseas deployment in 2011, the body of Osama bin Laden was flown to the Carl Vinson for burial at sea. Carrier Strike Group One was the second U.S. Navy carrier force to participate in Operation Inherent Resolve.

History

Second World War to 2004 
Carrier Strike Group 1 traces its lineage to Carrier Division 1 (CarDiv 1), the U.S. Navy's first seagoing naval aviation formation. It was first organized in October 1930 as part of the Aircraft Scouting Force, U.S. Fleet in the Atlantic. Carrier Division One was initially headquartered at the Coco Solo Naval Air Station located on the Atlantic side of the Panama Canal Zone near Colón, Panama. In 1939, Carrier Division One was transferred to the Pacific Scouting Force. Division aircraft carriers saw service in World War II, the Korean War, and the Vietnam War.

Rear Admiral John H. Cassady served as Commander Carrier Division 1 immediately after the end of Second World War. In this capacity, Cassady commanded Task Group 21.11, led by the carrier , during Operation Frostbite in February 1946. This naval exercise involved the embarked Air Group 74 conducting flight operations in Davis Straits between Labrador and Greenland. Previously, U.S. Naval carrier aviation had virtually no experience operating in Arctic waters. According to James Chace, the deployment of Task Group 125.4 "symbolized" American resolve against that Soviet pressure, marking the true beginning of the Cold War.

In June 1973, Carrier Division 1 was redesignated Carrier Group 1 (CarGru 1), and in January 1974, it was located at Naval Air Station North Island (NASNI) in San Diego, California.
The move was the result of an accord signed on 31 August 1972 between the U.S. and Japan. In addition to the morale factor of dependents housed alongside the crew, the move allowed continuous positioning of three carriers on the Pacific Rim at a time when the economic situation demanded the reduction of carriers in the fleet. In December 1990, following commanding Battle Group Delta, ComCarGru 1 was designated Commander, Training Battle Group, with responsibility for the Carrier Battle Group Inter-Deployment Training Cycle for the Pacific Fleet. In 1996 the group was commanded by Timothy Beard.

On 1 October 2004, Carrier Group 1 became Carrier Strike Group 1. In 2005, it was redesignated Commander, Strike Force Training Pacific. On 1 October 2009, Carrier Strike Group 1 was re-established based at Naval Base Point Loma, California under Rear Admiral Ted N. Branch.

2010 operations

On 12 January 2010,  departed Naval Station Norfolk for its new homeport of San Diego with squadrons VFA-81, VAW-125, VRC-40, and HS-15 embarked.

Just hours after the 2010 Haiti earthquake, Carl Vinson was redirected from the North Atlantic to Haiti to contribute to the Operation Unified Response relief effort. On 15 January, the Carl Vinson arrived off the coast of Port-au-Prince (pictured) to provide humanitarian aid, with its trained personnel, emergency relief supplies, and 19 helicopters on deck. On 16 January, the  arrived in Haiti to assist the Carl Vinson. In addition to providing medical relief, Carl Vinsons desalination capacity provided fresh drinkable water to Haiti's population. In total, the Carl Vinson delivered 1,095,442 lbs. (496,884 kg) of food; 147,591 gallons (558,693 liters) of potable water; and more than 40,000 lbs. (18,143 kg) of medical supplies. The ship's medical team treated 60 patients.  The Carl Vinsons embarked helicopters flew 1,299 sorties, conducted 1,152 medical evacuations, and delivered more than 2,900,000 lbs. (1,315,418 kg) of cargo ashore. On 1 February, the Carl Vinson, the cruiser , and the oceanographic survey ship  ended their mission and departed Haiti although ten of Carl Vinsons helicopters remained to support the relief effort.

In March 2010, during her transit around South America, the carrier strike group participated in Southern Seas 2010 naval maneuvers with the Brazilian, Uruguayan, and Argentine navies. The group also paid port visits to Rio de Janeiro, Brazil, and Callao, Peru.   Carl Vinson arrived at its new homeport on 12 April 2010 following a three-month underway period.

2010–2011 deployment

On 26 October 2010, Rear Admiral Samuel Perez, Jr. took command of the group. The group departed California for its 2010–11 deployment on 30 October. During the deployment, Carrier Air Wing Seventeen flew 1,656 combat air sorties, logging a total of 9,140 flight hours while 33 bombs and 2,970 rounds of 20-mm ammunition were expended.

On 5 May 2011, as part of NATO's counter-piracy Operation Ocean Shield, Vinson, Bunker Hill, and the Turkish frigate Giresun responded to a distress call from the Panamanian-flagged, Chinese-owned bulk carrier Full City.  An Indian Navy Tu-142 maritime patrol aircraft located the Full City, and while Giresun boarded the merchant vessel, Bunker Hill and its embarked HS-49 helicopters intercepted a dhow believed to be the 'mothership' for the pirate attack.  Bunker Hills boarding party seized weapons and other equipment commonly used in piracy, and the boarding party also sank a small skiff being towed by the dhow.  Giresuns boarding party found the Full Citys Chinese crew safe and in control of their ship. On 15 June 2011, Carl Vinson returned to its homeport of Naval Station San Diego, California.

2010–2011 deployment force composition

2010–2011 deployment exercises and port visits

2011–2012 deployment

On 18 November 2011, Rear Admiral Thomas K. Shannon took command of Carrier Strike Group One. On 30 November 2011, the strike group departed Naval Air Station North Island, California, for its 2011–2012 deployment.

On 10 January 2011, two guided-missile destroyers from Destroyer Squadron One, Stockdale and Gridley, and their embarked detachments from helicopter squadron HSL-49 participated in a passing exercise with the Japanese helicopter destroyer Kurama in the Sea of Japan.  Later in the same day, Stockdale and Gridley participated in separate maneuvers with units of the Republic of Korea Navy. Also, during its maiden deployment, the new British guided-missile destroyer  operated with Carrier Strike Group One and Carrier Strike Group Nine in the Persian Gulf and North Arabian Sea.  On 19 January 2012, while serving as the flagship of Combined Task Force 151, the destroyer Halsey and its HSL-49 helicopter detachment responded to a distress call from M/V Albrouj, a Yemeni dhow en route to Somalia from Yemen.

Carrier Strike Group One joined Carrier Strike Group Three, led by the carrier , in the North Arabian Sea, with Carrier Strike Group Nine, led by the carrier , en route to the Arabian Sea amid rising tension between the United States and the Islamic Republic of Iran over U.S. naval access to the Strait of Hormuz.

While with the Seventh Fleet, between 9–16 April 2012, Carrier Strike Group One participated in Malabar 2007 with the Indian Navy (pictured). Ships of the strike group paid a port visit to Brisbane on 5 May 2012 to mark the 70th anniversary of the Battle of Coral Sea. Between 7–16 May 2012, Carrier Strike Group One became the first U.S. Navy carrier strike group to participate in the Oceania Maritime Security Initiative, a maritime law enforcement operation within the exclusive economic zones of various South Pacific states.

On 11 May 2012, Carrier Strike Group One entered the U.S. Third Fleet area of responsibility. On 23 May 2012, the carrier Carl Vinson, the cruiser Bunker Hill, and the destroyer Halsey returned to Naval Air Station North Island, California, concluding the six-month-long 2011–2012 deployment for Carrier Strike Group One. During this deployment, aircraft from Carrier Strike Group One flew 1,085 missions in support of ground forces in Afghanistan, totaling 6,600 flight hours, while delivering 7,283 pounds (3.3 MT) of ordnance and expending 1,717 rounds of 20-mm ammunition in support of coalition operations in Afghanistan.  
2011–2012 deployment force composition

2011–2012 deployment exercises and port visits

2012–2014 operations

On 5 July 2012, the carrier Carl Vinson began a planned incremental availability (PIA) overhaul to undergo major maintenance and modernization, with a scheduled completion date of 1 February 2013. The Carl Vinson completed its maintenance on 3 February 2013 and began carrier qualifications with Carrier Air Wing 17 (pictured). Between 2–14 May 2013, the Carl Vinson and Carrier Air Wing Seventeen completed their Underway for Tailored Ship's Training Availability (TSTA) pre-deployment exercises.

On 22 March 2012, the cruiser Bunker Hill began its five-month Drydocking Selected Restricted Availability (DSRA) overhaul at the BAE Systems San Diego Ship Repair facility. The destroyer Gridley began its selected restricted availability (SRA) yard at BAE Systems San Diego Ship Repair facility on 26 June 2013.  Gridley began its sea trials on 7 October 2013. On 17 November 2013, the destroyer Higgins began its five-month Selected Restricted Availability (SRA) upkeep. The frigate McClusky completed its three-month Selected Restricted Availability (SRA) upkeep in January 2013.

On 21 February 2013, Rear Admiral David F. Steindl relieved Rear Admiral Thomas K. Shannon as commander, Carrier Strike Group One in ceremonies held aboard the group's flagship, the Vinson.  A surface warfare officer, Steindl had commanded Destroyer Squadron Seven while Shannon takes command of the Military Sealift Command.  On 28 January 2014, Admiral Steindl was relieved by Read Admiral Christopher Grady.  While in command, Steindl oversaw the strike group's carrier qualifications that produced more than 1,612 sorties, 1,827 arrested landings, and 2,471 flight hours.  A surface warfare officer, Admiral Grady commanded Destroyer Squadron 22 during its deployment to the U.S. Fifth Fleet with Carrier Strike Group Two.

On 25 July 2013, the frigate Rentz began its final deployment prior to its decommissioning in 2014 (pictured). The frigate McClusky participated in a Task Group Exercise (TGEX) with the U.S. and Canadian warships between 7–11 October 2013. The destroyer Stockdale completed an extended 10-month deployment to the middle East on 8 November 2013.

At the start of 2014, Carrier Strike Group One was in port and not underway. On 16 January 2014, USS Carl Vinson departed Naval Air Station North Island, California, to begin its Tailored Ship's Training Availability (TSTA) pre-deployment exercise with the Carrier Air Wing 17 and the rest of Carrier Strike Group One. These TSTA training drills and associated real-world scenarios emphasized damage control, flight deck operations, and simulated combat for the units of the carrier strike group, with each training phase evaluated by Afloat Training Group Pacific. Following the TSTA drills, Carrier Strike Group One began its Final Evaluation Problem (FEP) drill.  While underway, the strike group flew 1,609 air sorties, including 761 at night (pictured), earning certification from Commander, Naval Air Forces Pacific to continue to the next phase of its training.  On 10 February 2014, Carrier Strike Group One returned to Naval Air Station North Island, California, completing the TSTA/FEP phase of its pre-deployment exercises.

On 21 March 2014, Carrier Strike Group One completed its three-week-long Fleet Synthetic Training-Joint Exercise.  Such exercises allow carrier strike groups to train with other branches of the U.S. military while the ships are in port by connecting to a U.S. Third Fleet simulation gaming network under the supervision of Tactical Training Group Pacific (TTGP) based at Naval Base Point Loma, California.  On 2 June 2014, the carrier strike group successfully completed its Composite Training Unit Exercise (COMPTUEX) off the coast of Southern California.  These exercise evaluated the strike group's ability to react to live-training scenarios as an integral unit throughout every phase of naval warfare including sub-surface, surface, and air scenarios.  COMPTUEX is the capstone of the integrated training phase for Carrier Strike Group One, and it required the entire strike group to defeat simulated adversaries across the full spectrum of naval warfare.

On 9 June 2014, the strike group successfully completed its Joint Task Force Exercise (JTFEX) off the southern coast of California.  JTFEX is an integrated battle force exercise designed to test the capabilities of carrier strike groups operating within a joint environment.  It represented culmination of months of training for Carrier Strike Group One in preparation for its upcoming overseas deployment later in this summer.

2014–2015 deployment
On 22 August 2014, Carrier Strike Group One departed on its 2014–2015 deployment to the U.S. Seventh Fleet in the western Pacific Ocean and the U.S. Fifth Fleet in the Indian Ocean. The strike group completed an Undersea Warfare Exercise (USWEX) on 3 September 2014.  Task Forces 32 (Third Fleet maritime patrol and reconnaissance aircraft) and Task Force 34 (theater-wide anti-submarine warfare force) took part in the exercise, along with units from Australia and Canada.  On 9 September 2014, Carrier Strike Group One entered the U.S. Seventh Fleet's area of responsibility.

One aircraft was from squadron VFA-94 and the other was from squadron VFA-113. Both squadrons were based at Naval Air Station Lemoore, California, and both squadrons were part of Carrier Air Wing Seventeen embarked aboard Carl Vinson. One aviator was recovered in fair condition and received medical treatment aboard the Carl Vinson. Search-and-rescue (SAR) operations continued for the other aviator (pictured). The strike group was participating in Exercise Valiant Shield 2014 at the time of the mid-air collision. The search was called off on 14 September 2014, and the missing aviator was declared missing and presumed dead, with the crash incident under investigation.

Following  a port visit to Singapore, Carrier Strike Group One entered the U.S. Fifth Fleet's area of responsibility on 15 October 2014.  On 19 October 2014, Carrier Strike Group One began flying air combat missions in support of Operation Inherent Resolve, the U.S.-led air campaign against ISIL in Iraq and Syria (pictured). On 15 February 2015, the French Navy's Task Force 473, led by the nuclear aircraft carrier Charles de Gaulle, transited the Strait of Hormuz, joining Carrier Strike Group One in the Persian Gulf. Both carrier task groups began operating together (pictured), flying over 100 sorties per day. Charles De Gaulles  Super-Etendard and Rafale fighter jet aircraft flew 15 sorties per day while Carl Vinsons aircraft flies up to 25 combat sorties a day. The rest of the sorties flown were high-end training flights.  
 On 13 April 2015, Carrier Strike Group Twelve relieved Carrier Strike Group One as Task Group 50 in the Gulf of Oman.

On 27 March 2015, the USS Sterret took part in the air-sea rescue that successfully recovered the pilots of two F-15 fighter jet that may have been part of Operation Decisive Storm, the Saudi Arabian-led multilateral air campaign against Houthis forces in Yemen.
On 1 April 2015, the Sterret carried out a boarding of the Panamanian-flagged merchant ship Saisaban in support of the U.N.-authorized arms embargo against Houthi forces in Yemen.

On 16 April 2015, Carrier Strike Group One departed the U.S. Fifth Fleet, completing its six-month deployment. The strike group departed the U.S. Seventh Fleet on 23 May 2015. On 4 June 2015, Carrier Strike Group One arrived back at Naval Base Point Loma, California, concluding its 10-month deployment to the U.S. Fifth and Seventh fleets.<ref>{{cite web | title= Carl Vinson Carrier Strike Group Returns from Western Pacific, U.S. Central Command Deployment | url= http://www.navy.mil/submit/display.asp?story_id=87476 | work=  Number: NNS150604-24 | publisher= Commander, Carrier Strike Group (CSG) 1 Public Affairs | date=4 June 2015 | access-date=5 June 2015}}</ref>
2014–2015 deployment force composition

2014–2015 deployment operations, exercises, and port visits

2017 deployment
In mid February 2017, it was reported that Carrier Strike Group 1, including the Carl Vinson, USS Lake Champlain, USS Wayne E. Meyer, and USS Michael Murphy, started what the Navy called "routine operations" in the South China Sea. During the first half of April 2017, the strike group was reportedly ordered towards the Korean Peninsula amid growing concerns about North Korea's ballistic missile program. It had recently conducted training exercises with the ROK Navy in the Western Pacific. Confusion appeared to stem from a "glitch-ridden sequence of events" that included a premature announcement of the deployment from the Navy. In late April, the Strike Group was joined by two Japan Maritime Self-Defense Force destroyers; the JDS Ashigara and the JS Samidare as they transited the Philippine Sea en route to the Korean peninsula.

In early May, the JMSDF vessels left the Strike Group and were  replaced by the USS Stethem and two Republic of Korea Navy destroyers, the ROKS Sejong the Great and ROKS Yang Manchun. Later that month, the Strike Group was joined by the USS Ronald Reagan which had just completed a period of Selected Restricted Availability maintenance. In early June, the USS Ronald Reagan's Carrier Strike Group 5 joined CSG 1 in the Sea of Japan, along with the JMSDF vessels Ashigara'' and JDS Hyūga.

Group commanders 
Commander, Carrier Strike Group One reports to Commander, U.S. Third Fleet, which also supervises its pre-deployment training and certification that includes Composite Unit Training Exercises.  When deployed overseas, the strike group comes under the command of the numbered fleet in whose area it is operating (Third, Fourth, Fifth, Sixth, or Seventh Fleets). When deployed in this fashion, the group utilizes a task force or task group designator, for example, Task Group 50.1 in the Fifth Fleet area.

Group commanders since 2009 have included:

See also
 History of the United States Navy
 List of United States Navy aircraft squadrons
 U.S. Carrier Group tactics

Notes
Footnotes

Citations

Sources

External links
 

Carrier Strike Groups
Carrier Strike Group One
Military in San Diego
Military units and formations established in 2009